Bobby Lamar Etheridge (November 25, 1941 – September 17, 2015) was an American professional baseball third baseman, who played parts of two seasons in Major League Baseball (MLB) for the San Francisco Giants.

After three seasons in the Giants' farm system, he made his major league debut on July 16,  in the first game of a doubleheader against the Chicago Cubs at Candlestick Park. Etheridge entered the game as a late inning defensive replacement. The next day, he made his first major league start; with the Giants down 4-1 in the ninth inning, Etheridge hit a two out triple to drive in Bob Schroder and Jim Davenport. With Etheridge representing the tying run at third base, the following batter, Willie McCovey, grounded out to end the game.

For the season, Etheridge batted .226 with one home run and fifteen runs batted in (RBI) for the second place Giants. Though he struggled for playing time behind slugger Jim Ray Hart at third base, Etheridge was named a rookie All-Star by Topps.

At the end of the season, he was traded to the San Diego Padres with Bob Barton and Ron Herbel for Frank Reberger. After half a season with the Salt Lake City Bees, he was dealt from the Padres to the St. Louis Cardinals for Ron Willis before the trade deadline on June 15, 1970. He spent the rest of the  season and all of the  season with the Tulsa Oilers. While 1971 was his best season statistically since , Etheridge never reached the major leagues with the Cardinals.

References

External links

Bobby Etheridge at Baseball Almanac
Bobby Etheridge at The Baseball Page
Obituary

Major League Baseball third basemen
San Francisco Giants players
San Diego Padres scouts
Baseball players from Mississippi
1941 births
2015 deaths
Mississippi State Bulldogs baseball players
Mississippi Delta Trojans baseball players